Royal Consort Hye of the Gyeongju Yi clan (d. 3 February 1408) was the 3rd wife of King Gongmin of Goryeo. She was known with her Dharma name as Ho-wol and her new title as Princess Hyehwa given by Taejo of Joseon in 1392.

Biography

Background
The future Royal Consort Hye was born in Gyeongju as the daughter of Yi Je-hyeon who was a Goryeo politician, philosopher, writer, and poet.

Marriage and Palace life
In April 1359 (8th year reign of King Gongmin), his Queen Consort, Queen Noguk who didn't have any successor to him and several other ministers asked the King to raise a concubine from the noble family. After being chosen, Yi was given the consort title as Gracious Consort (혜비, 惠妃). However, when she entered the palace, it was said that Queen Noguk became little jealous of her and refused to eat.

However, in October 1372 (21st year of King Gongmin), he selected some young and handsome men and then ordered Han-An (한안) and Hong-Ryun (홍륜) from the Self-Defense Committee to had a sex with his consorts.

After King Gongmin was assassinated in 1374, she shaved her hair and became a Buddhist monk in Jeongeopwon (nowadays Cheongryong Temple, 청룡사). Even after King Gongmin's death, the courts still respected all of his widowed consorts and continued to provide their daily necessities. Meanwhile in December 1388, all of palace maids stopped providing their daily necessities.

Later life
Yi had a long-life until the early Joseon dynasty that established by Yi Seong-gye (이성계), she then honoured as Princess Hyewa (혜화궁주, 惠和宮主). However, she later passed away on 3 February 1408 and this was 12 years after the Goryeo's ended.

Before died, Taejong of Joseon gave her 30 seeds rices and beans (쌀과 콩 30석) and 100 volumes copies paper (종이 100권). Yi also become an Abbot in Jeongeopwon Temple but after death, her position was succeeded by King Taejo and Queen Sindeok's  2nd son, Grand Prince Uian's wife, Lady Sim (부인 심씨).

Ancestry

In popular culture
 Portrayed by Kim Ji-young in the 1983 MBC TV series The King of Chudong Palace.
 Portrayed by Jo Nam-Gyeong in the 1983 KBS TV series Foundation of the Kingdom.
 Portrayed by Moon Jeong-hee in the 2005–2006 MBC TV series Shin Don.
 Portrayed by Min Dan-Bi in the 2014 KBS TV series Jeong Do-jeon.

References

14th-century Korean people
Royal consorts of the Goryeo Dynasty
Year of birth unknown
1408 deaths
Korean Buddhist nuns
15th-century Buddhist nuns
14th-century Korean women
15th-century Korean women
People from Gyeongju